Kandhamaadhanamalai is a Siva temple in Thiruchendur in Thoothukudi district of Tamil Nadu (India).

Vaippu Sthalam
It is one of the shrines of the Vaippu Sthalams sung by Tamil Saivite Nayanar Appar.

Presiding deity
The presiding deity is known as Senthil Andavar.

Location
It is situated near the Perumal Temple at Thiruchendur Murugan Temple, in a hill-like structure.

References

Hindu temples in Thoothukudi district
Shiva temples in Thoothukudi district